The following is a list of charter schools in Alaska.

Charter Schools

 Anvil City Science Academy, Nome
 Highland Academy Charter School, Anchorage
 Juneau Community Charter School, Juneau
 Tongass School of Arts and Sciences, Ketchikan
 Twindly Bridge Charter School, Wasilla

References

School districts
School districts